Márcio Luiz Adurens, known as Marcinho or Márcio Luiz, (born July 31, 1981, in Santos, São Paulo) is a footballer.

Club career
Marcinho grew up in Brazil's football hot bed of São Paulo FC, where he played alongside players such as Kaká and Júlio Baptista. He helped São Paulo FC to the 1999 Campeão Paulista de Juniores title and scored the winning goal in the final of the 2000 Copa São Paulo de Futebol Júnior.

Overseas he has had spells at Portuguese Liga outfit Naval 1º de Maio and Hapoel Nazareth Illit, helping the Israeli club to reach the Israeli Premier League for the first time in its history.

In 2007, Marcinho played for Queensland Roar of the Hyundai A-League in Australia after impressing in trials during 2007 off-season. He was released by Queensland Roar at the beginning of 2008 after the close of the finals series. In 2009–'10 he will be playing for the Greek second division team of Diagoras F.C.

External links
 Queensland Roar profile
 Copa São Paulo de Futebol Júnior Grand Final article
 Article on Marcinho's first game at The Courier Mail

1981 births
Living people
Associação Naval 1º de Maio players
A-League Men players
Botafogo de Futebol e Regatas players
Brazilian footballers
Brazilian expatriate footballers
Brisbane Roar FC players
São Paulo FC players
Association football midfielders
Sportspeople from Santos, São Paulo